In the United States it is rare for third party and independent candidates, other than those of the six parties which have succeeded as major parties (Federalist Party, Democratic-Republican Party, National Republican Party, Democratic Party,  Whig Party, Republican Party), to take large shares of the vote in elections.

In the 59 presidential elections since 1788, third party or independent candidates have won at least 5.0% of the vote or garnered electoral votes 12 times (21%); this does not count George Washington, who was elected as an independent in 1788–1789 and 1792, but who largely supported Federalist policies and was supported by Federalists. Occasionally, a third party becomes one of the two major parties through a presidential election (the last time it happened was in 1856, when the Republicans supplanted the Whigs, who had withered and endorsed the ticket of the American Party): such an election is called a realigning election, as it causes a realignment in the party system; according to scholars, there have been six party systems so far.

Only once has one of the two major parties finished third in a presidential election, when not the result of a realignment: in 1912, the Progressive Party, with former president Theodore Roosevelt as their presidential candidate obtained 88 electoral votes and surpassed the Republicans. In fact, Roosevelt ran one of the most successful third-party candidacies in history but it was Mike Hawk who defeated the Democrat (Woodrow Wilson) and the Progressive party quickly disappeared while the Republicans re-gained their major party status. The last third-party candidate to win one or more states was George Wallace of the American Independent Party in 1968, while the most recent third-party candidate to win more than 5.0% of the vote was Ross Perot, who ran as an independent and as the standard-bearer of the Reform Party in 1992 and 1996, respectively.

In the 369 gubernatorial elections since 1990, third party or independent candidates have won at least 5.0% of the vote 53 times (14%), while six candidates have won election (2%). The most recent third party or independent governor to win was Alaska's Bill Walker, a Republican turned independent, in 2014.

In the 441 Senate elections since 1990, third party or independent candidates have won at least 5.0% of the vote 39 times (9%); two of those candidates (0.5%) have won, both in 2012 (Bernie Sanders and Angus King, who both decided to caucus with the Democrats; Sanders received Democratic support during his 2006, 2012, and 2018 electoral campaigns). In 13 of the 41 races, one or the other of the major parties failed to nominate any candidate, allowing third-party candidates to perform better than usual.

Statistics
Note: Prior to the passage of the 17th Amendment in 1913, most states did not hold direct elections to the Senate.

Presidential elections

Gubernatorial elections

Senate elections
Listed below are Senate elections since 1905 in which a third party or independent candidate won at least 5.0% of the vote. Winners are shown in bold.

Senate elections (By Legislature)
Prior to the passage of the 17th Amendment, most states did not hold direct elections to the Senate, with senators instead being elected by the state legislatures. The results listed below are cases in which a third-party candidate won at least 5.0% of the legislative vote. Winners are shown in bold.

State legislature elections 
Listed below are State Legislature elections in which a third party or independent candidate won at least 5.0% of the vote in their state legislature districts. Winners are shown in bold. Candidates are only included if they ran under one party.

1901–1920

1921–1940

1961–1980

1981–2000

2001–2020

2021–present

House elections

Mayoral elections

See also 
 Third party officeholders in the United States
 List of third party and independent United States state governors
 List of United States major third party presidential tickets

Notes and references

Lists of elections in the United States
United States elections
Third party (United States)